Pioneer species are hardy species that are the first to colonize barren environments or previously biodiverse steady-state ecosystems that have been disrupted, such as by wildfire.

Pioneer flora 
Some lichens grow on rocks without soil, so may be among the first of life forms, and break down the rocks into soil for plants. Since some uninhabited land may have thin, poor quality soils with few nutrients, pioneer species are often hardy plants with adaptations such as long roots, root nodes containing nitrogen-fixing bacteria, and leaves that employ transpiration. Note that they are often photosynthetic plants, as no other source of energy (such as other species) except light energy is often available in the early stages of succession, thus making it less likely for a pioneer species to be non-photosynthetic. 

The plants that are often pioneer species also tend to be wind-pollinated rather than insect-pollinated, as insects are unlikely to be present in the usually barren conditions in which pioneer species grow; however, pioneer species tend to reproduce asexually altogether, as the extreme or barren conditions present make it more favourable to reproduce asexually in order to increase reproductive success rather than invest energy into sexual reproduction. Pioneer species will eventually die, create plant litter, and break down as "leaf mold" after some time, making new soil for secondary succession (see below), and releasing nutrients for small fish and aquatic plants in adjacent bodies of water.

Some examples of pioneering plant species:
 Barren sand - lyme grass (Leymus arenarius), sea couch grass (Agropyron pungens), Marram grass (Ammophila breviligulata)
 Salt water - green algae, marine eel grass (Zostera spp.), pickleweed (Salicornia virginica), and cordgrass (hybrid Spartina × townsendii) and (Spartina anglica).
 Clear water - algae, mosses, freshwater eel grass (Vallisneria americana).
 Solidified lava flows (volcanic rock) -
 in Hawaii: swordfern (Polystichum munitum), ‘ōhi‘a lehua (Metrosideros polymorpha), ‘ohelo (Vaccinium reticulatum) and ‘āma‘u (Sadleria cyatheoides);
 on Surtsey: lichen (Stereocaulon vesuvianum and Placopsis gelida) and moss (Racomitrium ericoides); green algae 
 Disturbed areas such as construction sites, road cuttings and verges, cultivated lands - see ruderal species
 Bare clay - Orchids
 Mountains - Lichens

Pioneer fauna

The pioneering fauna will colonize an area only after flora and fungi have inhabited the area. Soil fauna, ranging from microscopic protists to larger invertebrates, have a role in soil formation and nutrient cycling. Bacteria and fungi are the most important groups in the breakdown of organic detritus left by primary producing plants such as skeletal soil, moss and algae. Soil invertebrates enhance fungal activity by breaking down detritus. As soil develops, earthworms and ants alter soil characteristics. Worm burrows aerate soil and ant hills alter sediment particle size dispersal, altering soil character profoundly.

Though vertebrates in general would not be considered pioneer species, there are exceptions. Natterjack toads are specialists in open, sparsely vegetated habitats which may be at an early seral stage. Wide-ranging generalists visit early succession stage habitats, but are not obligate species of those habitats because they use a mosaic of different habitats.

Vertebrates can effect early seral stages. Herbivores may alter plant growth. Fossorial mammals could alter soil and plant community development. In a profound example, a seabird colony transfers considerable nitrogen into infertile soils, thereby altering plant growth. A keystone species may facilitate the introduction of pioneer species by creating new niches. For example, beavers may flood an area, allowing new species to immigrate.

Secondary succession and pioneer species

The term pioneer species is also used to refer to the first species, usually plants, to return to an area after disturbance as part of the process of secondary succession. Disturbances may include floods, tornadoes, forest fires, deforestation, or clearing by other means.

Pioneer species tend to be fast-growing, shade-intolerant, and tend to reproduce large numbers of offspring quickly. The seeds of pioneer species can sometimes remain viable for years or decades in the soil seed bank and often are triggered to sprout by disturbance. Mycorrhizal fungi have a powerful influence on the growth of pioneer species. 

Some examples of the plants in such areas include:

 Raspberry - Rubus'' spp.
 Heaths - Ericaceae spp.
 Graminoids, forbs, and wildflowers - native, introduced, and invasive species: such as fire dependent seed, cone, and resprouter chaparral genera.

See also
 Colony (biology)
 Ruderal species
 Climax species

References

External links 
 

Botany
Ecological succession
Ecology terminology
Forest ecology